Timothy L. Jackson (born 1958) is an American professor of music theory who has spent most of his career at the University of North Texas and specializes in music of the eighteenth through twentieth centuries, Schenkerian theory, politics and music. He is the co-founder of the Journal of Schenkerian Studies. In 2020, he became controversial for editing a special issue of that journal containing articles criticizing Philip Ewell's plenary talk "Music Theory's White Racial Frame".

Early life and education 
Jackson was born in Ottawa, Ontario, Canada, in 1958. Since his mother, the artist Sarah Jackson, was an American citizen, he received dual US-Canadian citizenship.

Jackson received his B.A. in 1979 from McGill University in Montreal, Canada, and his PhD in 1988 from the City University of New York, both in music theory. His dissertation, chaired by Professor Carl Schachter, was on "The Last Strauss: Studies of the Letzte Lieder".

Career
Jackson was an assistant professor at Connecticut College from 1990 to 1997. He then became an assistant professor at the University of North Texas (UNT) in 1998 and was promoted to associate professor in 2001, full professor in 2005, and distinguished University research professor in 2011. He is one of the founding editors of the Journal of Schenkerian Studies, and has extensively published on late Romantic music, particularly on Bruckner, Brahms, Sibelius.

Journal of Schenkerian Studies controversy

In 2020-2021 Jackson was involved in a controversy in relation to the Journal of Schenkerian Studies.

Publications
1989/1990. "Schoenberg's Op. 14 Songs: Textual Sources and Analytical Perception", Theory and Practice 14–15, pp. 35–58.
1990. "Bruckner's Metrical Numbers", 19th-Century Music 14/2, pp. 101–131.
1991. "Schubert's Revisions of Der Jüngling und der Tod, D 545a–b, and Meeresstille, D 216a–b", The Musical Quarterly 75/3, pp. 336–361.
1992. Review: "Current Issues in Schenkerian Analysis", The Musical Quarterly 76/2, pp. 242–263.
1992. "Gabriel Fauré's Expansions of Nonduple Hypermeter in La fleur qui va sur l'eau, Op. 85, No. 2", In Theory Only 12/3–4, pp. 1–27.
1993. Review: "Arnold Schoenberg, the Composer as Jew", Theory and Practice 18, In Celebration of Arnold Schoenberg (2), pp. 171–178.
1995. "Aspects of Sexuality and Structure in the Later Symphonies of Tchaikovsky", Music Analysis 14/1, pp. 3–25.
1996. "The Tragic Reversed Recapitulation in the German Classical Tradition", Journal of Music Theory 40.1, pp. 23–72.
1997. "'Your Songs Proclaim God's Return' – Arnold Schoenberg, the Composer and His Jewish Faith", International Journal of Musicology 6, pp. 281–317.
1997. "The Finale of Bruckner's Seventh Symphony and the Tragic Reversed Sonata Form", Bruckner Studies, eds. Timothy L. Jackson and Paul Hawkshaw (Cambridge: Cambridge University Press), pp. 209–255.
1997. "Bruckner's 'Oktaven'", Music & Letters 78/3, pp. 391–409.
1998. "Dmitry Shostakovich: The Composer as Jew", Shostakovich Reconsidered, eds. Allan B. Ho and Dmitry Feofanov (London: Toccata Press), pp. 597–640.
1999. Cambridge Handbook on Tchaikovsky's Sixth Symphony (Pathétique) (Cambridge: Cambridge University Press).
1999. "Diachronic Transformation in a Schenkerian Context: Brahms's Haydn Variations", Schenker Studies 2, eds. Carl Schachter and Hedi Siegel, (Cambridge: Cambridge University Press), pp. 239–275.
2001. "The Adagio of the Sixth Symphony and the anticipatory tonic recapitulation in Bruckner, Brahms and Dvořák", Perspectives on Anton Bruckner, eds. Timothy L. Jackson, Paul Hawkshaw (Yale), and Crawford Howie (Manchester), (London: Ashgate Press).
2001. Sibelius Studies, eds. Timothy L. Jackson and Veijo Murtomäki (Sibelius Academy), (Cambridge: Cambridge University Press).
2001. "The Schenker–Oppel Exchange: Schenker as Composition Teacher", Music Analysis 20/1, pp. 1–116.
2001. "Bruckner" in The New Grove Dictionary of Music and Musicians, ed. S. Sadie and J. Tyrrell (London: Macmillan)
2006. "Hinauf strebt's: Song Study with Carl Schachter", Structure and Meaning in Tonal Music, eds. L. Poundie Burstein and David Gagné (Festschrift in Honor of Carl Schachter), pp. 191–202.
2009. "Escaping from a Black Hole: Facing Depression in Academia", Music Theory Online 15/3–4.
2010. Sibelius in the Old and New World: Aspects of His Music, Its Interpretation, and Reception, eds. Timothy L. Jackson and Veijo Murtomäki (Peter Lang: New York).
2015. "The 'Pseudo-Einsatz''' in Two Handel Fugues: Heinrich Schenker's Analytical Work with Reinhard Oppel", Bach to Brahms. Essays on Musical Design and Structure, eds. David Beach and Yosef Goldenberg (University of Rochester Press), pp. 173–203.
2016. "The First Movements of Anton Eberl's Symphonies in E-flat major and D minor, and Beethoven's Eroica: Toward 'New' Sonata Forms?", Explorations in Schenkerian Analysis, eds. David Beach and Su Yin Mak (Eastman Studies in Music, University of Rochester Press), pp. 61–96.

References

External links
Timothy Jackson's university bio page and curriculum vitae (2018)
Legal Complaint for Timothy Jackson v. Laura Wright et al. as members of the Board of Regents for the University of North Texas System et al.,'' U.S. E.D.Texas Case No. 4:21-cv-00033 (January 14, 2021) and the full 300-plus page complaint including exhibits A through V

1958 births
Living people
McGill University School of Music alumni
City University of New York alumni
Connecticut College faculty
University of North Texas College of Music faculty
Canadian musicologists
American musicologists